Zambia competed in the 2011 Commonwealth Youth Games held in the British Crown Dependency of Isle of Man from 7 to 13 September 2011. National Olympic Committee of Zambia sent a delegation of eight people included six competitors – all men – and two officials. The Zambian delegation was economically supported by the Commonwealth Games Federation. Zambia won only one bronze medal and finished last in the medal table, with 10 other Commonwealth Games Associations.

Delegation
National Olympic Committee of Zambia selected eight members as an official delegation of nation in the 2011 Commonwealth Youth Games. It consisted five competitors, including two pugilists (Obed Mutapa and Charles Lumbwe), two swimmers (Chishala Mukuka and Ralph Goveia) middle distance runner Harry Mulenga and Chongo Mulenga, who participated in badminton. Delegation was also accompanied by the boxing coach Musonda Chinungu and swimming coach Chisela Kanchela. 

The Commonwealth Games Federation supported the National Olympic Committee of Zambia to send its delegation for the Games as a part of its sports development program.

Athletics

Badminton

Boxing

References
   

2011 in Zambian sport
Nations at the 2011 Commonwealth Youth Games
Zambia at multi-sport events